Phycita metzneri is a species of snout moth. It is found in France, Italy, Croatia, Hungary, Romania, Bulgaria, North Macedonia, Greece and Turkey.

References

Moths described in 1846
Phycitini
Moths of Europe
Moths of Asia